The Society for French Studies, or SFS, is the oldest learned association for French Studies in the UK and Ireland. It aims to promote teaching and research in French Studies within higher education.  the president is Professor Judith Still.

Scholarly activities
The society has a quarterly journal published on its behalf called French Studies (Oxford University Press), as well as a bulletin for shorter pieces and news called The French Studies Bulletin. The society also produces Research Monographs in French Studies with Legenda (imprint) and Modern Humanities Research Association. There is also an annual conference.

Each year, the society awards the R. Gapper Book Prize, the R. Gapper Postgraduate Essay Prize, and the R. Gapper Undergraduate Essay Prize for the best scholarship produced by scholars at higher education institutions in the UK or Ireland. These prizes are presented to their winners at the annual conference.

Lobbying

The society promotes and defends languages learning and the humanities in general within the national educational agendas of the United Kingdom and Ireland, and also internationally. It pursues these aims through a variety of activities and communications, including collaboration and active lobbying within the policy sphere. It has lobbied and published statements concerning open-access publishing, A-level exam content, and the future of modern language learning in schools and universities in the UK and Ireland. Agencies with which it has engaged since 2014 include HEFCE, Ofqual, and the UK Department for Education and the Department for Business, Innovation and Skills.

Past Presidents
2016–2017: Bill Burgwinkle
2015–2016: Mairéad Hanrahan
1999: Wendy Ayres-Bennett

References

External links
 The Society for French Studies website

French literature
Learned societies of the United Kingdom
Literary societies